Cataxipha is a genus of moths belonging to the family Tineidae. It contains only one species, Cataxipha euxantha, which is found in Cameroon.

References

Endemic fauna of Cameroon
Tineidae
Monotypic moth genera
Insects of Cameroon
Moths of Africa
Tineidae genera